Crangonidae is a family of shrimp, of the superfamily Crangonoidea, including the commercially important species Crangon crangon. Its type genus is  Crangon. Crangonid shrimps' first pair of pereiopods have partially chelate claws that they use to capture their prey. They burrow shallowly into sediment on the sea floor, and feed on bivalves, crustaceans, polychaetes, and some small fish.

Two fossil species are known: Crangon miocenicus, discovered in 2001 in the early Miocene of the north Caucasus in Russia, and Morscrangon acutus, discovered in 2006 in the fur formation (early Eocene) in Denmark.

Twenty-four genera are included in the family:

Aegaeon Agassiz, 1846
Argis Krøyer, 1842
Crangon Fabricius, 1798
Lissocrangon Kuris & Carlton, 1977
Lissosabinea Christoffersen, 1988
Mesocrangon Zarenkov, 1965
Metacrangon Zarenkov, 1965
†Morscrangon Garassino & Jakobsen, 2005
Neocrangon Zarenkov, 1965
Notocrangon Coutière, 1900
Paracrangon Dana, 1852a
Parapontocaris Alcock, 1901
Parapontophilus Christoffersen, 1988
Philocheras Stebbing, 1900
Placopsicrangon Komai & Chan, 2009
Pontocaris Bate, 1888
Pontophilus Leach, 1817
Pseudopontophilus Komai, 2004
Prionocrangon Wood-Mason & Alcock, 1891
Rhynocrangon Zarenkov, 1965
Sabinea J. C. Ross, 1835
Sclerocrangon Sars, 1883
Syncrangon Kim & Hayashi, 2003
Vercoia Baker, 1904

References

Caridea
Decapod families